(), simply branded as , was an amusement park in Mexico City, Mexico. In 2015, it was bought by Ventura Entertainment and renamed to its last name.

On 28 September 2019 an accident on the Quimera roller coaster killed two people and injured two others. An investigation determined that design flaws by its designer along with a lack of maintenance by the personnel were likely to blame for the accident. On 13 October 2019, the amusement park authorities announced on their official website the definitive closure of the park after the Mexico City Government revoked their license. After Ventura Entertainment lost the license, the government sent a message to other park companies such as Six Flags, Cedar Fair, and Seaworld to take over the license of the property.
After Bosque de Chapultepec reopened, most of La Feria's furniture and fences that separate the attractions are being dismantled and the property is being cleaned, and the new owner is yet to be announced, since the six companies that were interested asked for the period of selection, which was meant to be until 20 April 2020, to be extended because of the COVID-19 pandemic, so the government is yet to announce the new date. The replacement is expected to be named Aztlán.

Attractions

La Feria Chapultepec Mágico had approximately 50 different rides and other amusements, as well as several animal attractions. While this list includes many flat rides, it also includes several former record-holding roller coasters: among these, Montaña Rusa, which held the world's record for tallest roller coaster, and Quimera, which was the first roller coaster in the world with three vertical loops. One of the coasters, Cascabel, was formerly at Kennywood amusement park near Pittsburgh, Pennsylvania. The park also had a wild mouse roller coaster named Ratón Loco.

Another of the park's noteworthy attractions was a zero-emission scenic train that was developed with the help of the Institute of Engineering at the National Autonomous University of Mexico. The train was reported by La Crónica de Hoy to be the first of its kind when it was opened for Ecofest 2012.

Pricing and admission
Some travel guides cited the relatively low cost of visiting La Feria when compared to other North American amusement parks. The park had a multi-tiered pricing structure for its ride passes. Lower cost passes allowed for admission to many of the smaller flat rides, while more expensive passes allowed for admission to the more extreme rides, such as the roller coasters.

Roller coasters
Cascabel
Montaña Rusa
Quimera
Ratón Loco

Selected thrill rides

Aladino
Batidora
Nao de China
Avion del Amor
Martillo
Tren del Amor
Cóndor
Power Tower
Formula 1 Race Track
Top Spin

References

External links

La Feria Official Website (last version archived on 28 August 2019 by Wayback Machine)
La Feria Chapultepec Mágico at the Roller Coaster DataBase

Amusement parks in Mexico City
1964 establishments in Mexico
2019 disestablishments in Mexico
Defunct amusement parks
Chapultepec
Amusement parks opened in 1964
Amusement parks closed in 2019
Modern ruins